Nathan Brown is an author, singer-songwriter, and award-winning poet who served as the Oklahoma Poet Laureate from 2013 to 2014.

Life
Nathan Brown was born in Longview, Texas on March 16, 1965. His family moved to Norman, Oklahoma in January 1970, where he grew up and went to college. He now hails from Wimberley, a small town in the Hill Country of Texas where he has lived with his wife, Ashley, since 2013.

Nathan holds an interdisciplinary PhD in English and Journalism with an emphasis in Creative and Professional Writing from the University of Oklahoma. After teaching at OU for almost twenty years, he returned to the Austin area to be closer to the music scene there and tours the country full-time as a poet, musician, and workshop leader. He has published 20 books, one of which (Two Tables Over) won the Oklahoma Book Award for Poetry, and another, Karma Crisis: New and Selected Poems, was a finalist for the Paterson Poetry Prize in New Jersey. He is the founder of Mezcalita Press.

He also began as the instructor for the Descanso Creatives intensive workshop series in 2018. The workshops are a "deep-dive" and culturally-immersive writing experience. Beginning in Tuscany, Italy, future workshops are planned for Ireland (2019) and France (2020).

Published books
 100 Years (Mezcalita Press, 2019)
 An Honest Day's Confession (Mezcalita Press, 2018)
 An Honest Day's Prayer (Mezcalita Press, 2017)
 An Honest Day's Ode (Mezcalita Press, 2017)
 I Shouldn't Say... The Mostly Unedited Poems of Ezra E. Lipschitz (Mezcalita Press, 2017)
 Arse Poetica: The Mostly Unedited Poems of Ezra E. Lipschitz (Mezcalita Press, 2017)
 Apocalypse Soon: The Mostly Unedited Poems of Ezra E. Lipschitz (Mezcalita Press, 2017)
 Don't Try, a collection of co-written poems with Jon Dee Graham (Mezcalita Press, 2016)
 My Salvaged Heart: Story of a Cautious Courtship (Mezcalita Press, 2016)
 To Sing Hallucinated: First Thoughts on Last Words (Mezcalita Press, 2015)
 Oklahoma Poems, and Their Poets (Mezcalita Press, 2014)
 Less Is More, More or Less (Mezcalita Press, 2013)
 Karma Crisis:New and Selected Poems (Mezcalita Press, 2012)
 Letters to the One-Armed Poet: A Memoir of Friendship, Loss, and Butternut Squash Ravioli (Village Books Press, 2011)
 My Sideways Heart (Mongrel Empire Press, 2010)
 Two Tables Over (Village Books Press, 2008)
 Not Exactly Job (Mongrel Empire Press, 2007)
 Ashes over the Southwest (Greystone Press, 2005)
 Suffer the Little Voices (Greystone Press, 2005)
 Hobson's Choice (Greystone Press, 2002)

Discography
 The Streets of San Miguel (2019)
 Gypsy Moon (2009)
 The Why in the Road
 Driftin' Away
 Fall
 What does this have to do with anything?

See also 

 Poets Laureate of Oklahoma

References

External links
Nathan Brown website

Living people
American male poets
Poets Laureate of Oklahoma
American male singer-songwriters
American folk musicians
American folk singers
People from Longview, Texas
People from Norman, Oklahoma
People from Wimberley, Texas
Year of birth missing (living people)
University of Oklahoma alumni
Singer-songwriters from Oklahoma
Singer-songwriters from Texas